The N15 road is a national primary road in the north-west of Ireland. It runs from Sligo to Lifford,  County Donegal. It forms part of the proposed Atlantic Corridor route. It also goes to the border with Northern Ireland.

Route
The N15 commences halfway across Lifford Bridge (which crosses the River Foyle between County Donegal and County Tyrone), continuing the route of the A38 (from Strabane on the east side of the river). In Lifford, west of the River Foyle, the N14 meets the N15, ending at a junction in the town centre. The N15 leaves to the southwest, changing to run west at the point just west of Clady. It continues west through Castlefin, Liscooley and Killygordon to reach Stranorlar.

In Stranorlar, the N13 commences, leaving the N15 to head north, with the N15 itself turning southwest to cross the River Finn to enter Ballybofey. From here, it continues southwest through the mountains and Barnesmore Gap (passing southeast of Bluestack Mountain) towards Donegal Town. East of the town itself, the N56 road starts at a junction on the N15 and runs around the north of the town, with the N15 turning to the south, to bypass the eastern side of Donegal Town. The N15 crosses the Drumenny Burn on the eastern outskirts of Donegal Town.

South of Donegal Town, the N15 passes by Ballintra to the west. Further south, the route follows a road opened in 2006, bypassing Ballyshannon to the east and crossing the River Erne on a viaduct.

The road enters County Leitrim  in the west of Ireland, directly west of Bundoran (the bypass passes south of the town). Tullaghan is the only village along the N15 in the county, also bypassed.

The N15 runs closer to the coastline in County Sligo, passing through Cliffoney and Grange as it proceeds southwest. The road then passes through the villages of Drumcliff and Rathcormack before entering Sligo. The route ends at the start of the N4, which continues through the town as the Sligo Inner Relief Road dual carriageway.

Planned and Completed upgrades

The  route between Lifford and Stranorlar is a single carriageway road of very poor quality. A replacement of the current alignment with a new single carriageway road is planned, bypassing Castlefin, Liscooley, and Killygordon. This will connect with a  2+1 bypass of Stranorlar and Ballybofey which is also planned. This will bypass the towns to the south, with a new crossing of the River Finn.

A bypass of the entire route was planned, with dual carriageway for at least part of the route. A route had been selected for the project, with the new road to run closer to the mountains and the bay than the existing N15. However, the NRA didn't give funding for the road and the project was suspended The local radio station in the North-West, Ocean FM had a special report in 2017 on how the road in Sligo needs to be upgraded in the wake of 3 crashes on this stretch of road in less than a fortnight.

Instead of a completely new route, the NRA and TII decided to go ahead with a project called the N4-N15 Urban Improvements scheme starting with the widening of Hughes Bridge to a six-lane bridge and progressed as a Minor Improvement Scheme from 2015 through to mid-2016 costing €2.5 Million before VAT. The project was completed on 17 July 2016

Continuing with the N4-N15 Urban Improvements, in August 2019, it was announced that €14 Million had been allocated for a 730-meter upgrade form Hughes bridge to just past the N4-N15-N16 junction. It would include a six-lane carriageway, improved cycle paths and footpaths, LED streetlights, upgrades on Copper bridge on the N15, and a major redesign of the R291 Rosses Point Junction. Work was originally supposed to take 12 months and start in August 2019 and finish in the autumn of 2020. The finish date was then extended to spring 2021, but the project continued .

A major repaving of the road from Creevykeel Crossroads to Castelgal was started in mid-October 2019 and were very nearly complete before the Covid-19 lockdown happened in Ireland. They returned in late May to put the finishing touches on the road. The road improvements included Lowering the speed limit at Creevykeel Crossroads to 60 km/h either side of the crossroads. Despite the road improvements, The road from Castelgal to The Sligo county boundary was still in bad condition with locals calling for the whole road to be repaved.

In September 2020, Ocean FM Reported that TII allocated between 3 and 4 million Euros to upgrade a stretch of road that is 3.5 Kilometres long between Grange and the townland of Cashelgarran at Henrys Restaurant. It would include rebuilding, strengthening and repaving the stretch of road.

See also
Motorways in Ireland
National secondary road
Regional road
Roads in Ireland

References

External links

Roads Act 1993 (Classification of National Roads) Order 2006 – Department of Transport
N15 Lifford – Stranorlar – Ballybofey – Donegal County Council
N15 Ballybofey Stranorlar Bypass – Donegal County Council
N15 Realignment – Sligo to County Boundary – Sligo County Council

15
Roads in County Donegal
Roads in County Leitrim
Roads in County Sligo